Harmonia Rosales (born 1984) is an Afro-Cuban American artist from Chicago.

Work 
Rosales works mostly as a classical painter depicting women and people of color assuming roles of power and beauty in exquisite imaginings of ancient myths, Afro-Cuban culture, and Renaissance paintings. Her artistic style are detailed renderings involving oil paint, raw linens, gold leaf, and wood panels. Since 2017, her work has used iron oxide to portray not only African soil but the decay in African history in America, a choice she intended to amplify the question “Why? Why have we accepted Eurocentric perceptions of beauty and historical narratives for so long?”

In 2017, Rosales participated in the Museum of Science and Industry's Black Creativity Juried Art Exhibition. The painting was of her daughter and included all the elements of being overexposed and categorized at a young age. This award encouraged Rosales to move away from portraits and create a strong body of work. Due to Rosales' painting techniques, she is only able to produce 9-10 paintings a year.

Career 

In 2017, Rosales posted an image, The Creation of God, on social media, of her first completed work for her solo exhibition Black Imaginary To Counter Hegemony. The painting is an oil-on-canvas piece that took two months to craft. In this painting, Rosales recreates Michelangelo’s Creazione di Adamo (The Creation of Adam) by displaying both God and Adam as Black women. The Creation of Adam shows Jehovah’s finger and the elegant, naked body of the first man. In contrast, the painting created by Rosales shows God as a black woman and creates the illusion of the heavens as a womb from which she is birthing Eve in an act of strength and empowerment. This image was created to show that White subjects are the standard in classic art while challenging the viewer to consider why that practice is commonly accepted.
In 2017 Rosales was picked up by Simard-Bilodeau Contemporary, an art gallery based in LA and was given her first solo exhibition. Included in the show was Creation of God. One of her many works included The Birth of Oshun, an oil-on-canvas painting, which reimagines Sandro Botticelli’s work, Birth of Venus, by placing Oshun, the Yoruba goddess of fertility, sensuality, and prosperity, in a sea shell surrounded by black angels, in contrast to Botticelli’s painting where a White Venus, the goddess of love, beauty, and fertility, is in a sea shell surrounded by white angels. In this painting, Oshun has vitiligo that is made of gold patches that have roots in traditional Nigerian storytelling traditions. The painting is meant to challenge the perceptions of beauty because as she says, “traditionally, we see Venus as this beautiful woman with flowing hair. My hair never flowed, so I’m wondering why this is supposed to be a painting of the most beautiful woman in the world.” This painting works to show the beauty in imperfection, such as the patches of Vitiligo, a skin condition. She also says that she created this work with her daughter in mind in order to show her daughter that black women, and their natural hair, are beautiful.

Personal life 
Rosales was born on February 6, 1984, in Chicago, Illinois, to Cuban-born Giraldo Rosales and Jamaican-Jewish illustrator Melodye Benson Rosales. She was raised in the Santería religious tradition. 

Having both parents’ ancestries rooted along the West African coast, Rosales meticulously entwines her adversities and cultural background to challenge the viewers' ideas about identity and empowerment in her art.

Public exhibits and collections 
 Garden of Eve, 2022, UTA Artist Space, Los Angeles, CA.
 Harmonia Rosales: Entwined, 2022, UCSB Art, Design & Architecture Museum, Santa Barbara, CA.
 Miss Education: Reclaiming Our Identity,' 2022, Museum of Contemporary African Diasporan Arts (MoCADA)
 Femme Touch, 2020, Warhol Museum Pittsburgh, PA.
 Queen, 2020, The Wright Museum, Detroit, MI.
 Oya's Betrayal, 2020 , Smithsonian National Museum of African American History and Culture NW Washington, DC
 Give me Body: Femme Re-Divined, Museum of Contemporary African Diasporan Arts, Brooklyn, NY.
 The Harvest'', 2018, Mount Holyoke College Art Museum South Hadley, MA

References

1984 births
Living people
Artists from Chicago
Painters from Illinois
American women painters
Glenville State College alumni
21st-century American women artists
21st-century American painters
American people of Cuban descent
American people of African descent
Afro-Latino culture in the United States
People of Afro–Cuban descent
American people of Latin American descent
American people of Caribbean descent